The 1944 Coupe de France Final was a football match held at Parc des Princes, Paris on May 7, 1944, that saw EF Nancy-Lorraine defeat EF Reims-Champagne 4–0 thanks to goals by Marcel Parmeggiani, Marcel Poblomme (2) and Michel Jacques.

Match details

See also
1943–44 Coupe de France

External links
Coupe de France results at Rec.Sport.Soccer Statistics Foundation
Report on French federation site

Coupe De France Final
1944
Coupe de France Final
Coupe de France Final